One Dance UK is the national body for dance in the UK, formed by the merger of Association of Dance of the African Diaspora (ADAD), Dance UK, National Dance Teachers Association (NDTA) and Youth Dance England. The organisation represents dancers at all levels of the dance industry, and champions excellence in education, youth dance, dance of the African diaspora, performance, health and well-being, management, leadership and career development.

Healthier Dancer Programme

One Dance UK's Healthier Dancer Programme works to improve the physical and psychological health and well-being of dancers through providing advice and information on health, fitness and injury prevention for dancers, both for recreational dancers and for those in vocational training and working professionally. The organisation holds regular events for dance professionals, healthcare practitioners and scientists in order to share current research on dance health.

One Dance UK operates the Healthcare Practitioners Directory, a UK wide database of medical practitioners and complementary therapists with experience of working with dancers.

One Dance UK also advocates for improved healthcare for dancers, and along with the National Institute of Dance Medicine and Science, was a key organisation involved in the creation of NHS dance injury clinics, located at the Royal Orthopaedic Hospital, Queen Elizabeth Hospital Birmingham and Royal United Hospital Bath.

Merger

On 26 March 2015 Dance UK announced that it had received three-year funding from Arts Council England to merge with Association of Dance of the African Diaspora, National Dance Teachers Association and Youth Dance England to create a unified "go-to" industry body that would become the subject association for dance in schools in the UK.

The name of the new organisation, One Dance UK, as well its new website were launched 7 December 2015 at the Royal Society of Medicine at an event attended by approximately 450 dance professionals.

The merger came into effect on 1 April 2016.

Relocation 
In 2019 One Dance UK relocated from their offices in London to a new site in Birmingham. Housed within the Birmingham Hippodrome campus, the One Dance UK offices sit within the newly opened Dance Hub space which has been built on top of the existing structure which houses Birmingham Royal Ballet, Dance Exchange and Birmingham Hippodrome.

References

Dance in the United Kingdom
Performing arts in the United Kingdom
Professional associations based in the United Kingdom
Charities based in London